T. purpuratus may refer to:

Touit purpuratus, the sapphire-rumped parrotlet, a bird species
Trachyphonus purpuratus, the yellow-billed barbet, a bird species